Nikos Gidopoulos (born 26 July 1995) is a Greek professional footballer who plays as a goalkeeper for German club SV Dessau 05.

Honours
Trikala
Gamma Ethniki: 2014–15
Gamma Ethniki Cup: 2014–15

References

1995 births
Living people
Greek footballers
Greek expatriate footballers
Football League (Greece) players
Gamma Ethniki players
Trikala F.C. players
GAS Ialysos 1948 F.C. players
Olympiacos Volos F.C. players
Association football goalkeepers
Footballers from Trikala